Over the Limit may refer to

 WWE Over the Limit, a professional wrestling pay-per-view event
 Over the Limit, album by Trout Fishing in America (band)